Bhartrahari is a Bollywood film. It was released in 1944. The film was directed by Chaturbhuj Doshi for Navin Pictures and produced by P. B. Zaveri. The music was composed by Khemchand Prakash and the lyricist was Pandit Indra Chandra. The cast included Surendra, Mumtaz Shanti, Jehanara Kajjan, Aroon, Sulochana Chatterji and Yashwant Dave.

A devotional film, it was based on the approx. 1st century BC King Bharthari of Ujjaini, of folklore. The Hindi film version shows his love for his wife Pingla, his abdication in favour of his brother Vikramaditya, and his subsequent renunciation, going on to become a famous saint-poet.

Cast
 Surendra
 Mumtaz Shanti
 Jehanara Kajjan
 Aroon
 Sulochana Chatterji
 Yashwant Dave
 Nagendra

Tamil version
Bharthruhari was made in Tamil in 1944 and directed by K. Subramanyam. The film starred Serukalathur Sama, B. Jayamma, G. Pattu Iyer, N. S. Krishnan and V. N. Janaki. The music was composed was V. K. Parthasarathy Ayyangar. The film had a duet sung by Jayamma and Krishnan.

Soundtrack
Music director was Khemchand Prakash and one of the notable songs by Amirbai Karnataki was the semi-classical bol Banav Thumri, "Chanda Des Piya Ke" in Raga Marubihag. The bhajan sung by Surendra, "Bhiksha De De Maiya Pingla" followed the pattern set by K. C. Dey in Dhoop Chhaon (1935) "Teri Gathari Mein Laaga Chor" for bhajan singing and became popular.  Lyricist was Pandit Indra and the singers were  Amirbai Karnataki, Surendra and Jehanara Kajjan.

Song List

References

External links
 

1944 films
1940s Hindi-language films
Indian black-and-white films
Indian fantasy films
1940s fantasy films
Films directed by Chaturbhuj Doshi